Pregnancy options clinic may refer to:

Crisis pregnancy center, an establishment that counsels pregnant women against abortion
Pregnancy options counseling, a non-directive form of counseling for pregnant women